James Hargreaves ( 1720 – 22 April 1778) was an English weaver, carpenter and inventor who lived and worked in Lancashire, England.  He was one of three men responsible for the mechanisation of spinning: Hargreaves is credited with inventing the spinning jenny in 1764; Richard Arkwright patented the water frame in 1769; and Samuel Crompton combined the two, creating the spinning mule in 1779.

Life and work
James Hargreaves was born at Stanhill, Oswaldtwistle in Lancashire. He was described as "stout, broadest man of about five-foot ten, or rather more". He was illiterate and worked as a hand loom weaver during most of his life. He married and baptismal records show he had 13 children, of whom the author Baines in 1835 was aware of '6 or 7'.

Spinning jenny

 

The idea for the spinning jenny is said to have come when a one-thread spinning wheel was overturned on the floor, and Hargreaves saw both the wheel and the spindle continuing to revolve. He realized that if several spindles were placed upright and side by side, several threads might be spun at once. The spinning jenny was confined to producing cotton weft threads and was unable to produce yarn of sufficient quality for the warp. A high-quality warp was later supplied by Arkwright's spinning frame.

Hargreaves built a jenny for himself and sold several of them to his neighbours. 
His invention was initially welcomed by other hand spinners until they saw a fall in the price of yarn.

Opposition to the machine caused Hargreaves to leave for Nottingham, where the cotton hosiery industry benefited from the increased provision of suitable yarn. In Nottingham Hargreaves made jennies for a man named Shipley, and on 12 June 1770, he was granted a patent, which provided the basis for legal action (later withdrawn) against the Lancashire manufacturers who had begun using it. With a partner, Thomas James, Hargreaves ran a small mill in Hockley and lived in an adjacent house. The business was carried on until he died in 1778 when his wife received a payment of £400. When Samuel Crompton invented the spinning mule in c.1779, he stated he had learned to spin in 1769 on a jenny that Hargreaves had built.

Dispute over Hargreaves' contribution
False claims were being made about Hargreaves as early as 1828, when Richard Guest, writing in the Edinburgh Review in 1828, introduced several errors, and a distorted view of his life and contributions has persisted ever since. Parish burial records show that Hargreaves (misspelt as "Hargraves") did not die in the workhouse, as had been claimed; 

A ferocious legal battle had been mounted in the 1780s to have Richard Arkwright's most important patents annulled. 
Thomas Highs had claimed that he was the true inventor of both the spinning frame and the spinning jenny. Conflicting evidence as to the circumstances of several inventions was canvassed, and although Arkwright's patents were annulled, the question of authorship was not settled.
other records show that neither Hargreaves's wife nor any of his daughters bore the name Jenny, contrary to a myth repeated in school textbooks as late as the 1960s, children's books as late as 2005 and on educational websites to the present day. The 'jenny' refers to an engine, a common slang term in Lancashire in the 18th century, and encountered occasionally even now.

References

Bibliography
 Hargraves Spinning Jenny – Confined to spinning weft
 Deutsches Museum (Auf Deutsch) Secondary source.

Further reading

External links

 Essay from www.cottontown.org on Hargreaves and the Spinning Jenny
 Essay from www.cottontimes.co.uk/

People of the Industrial Revolution
English engineers
English inventors
People from Oswaldtwistle
1720 births
1778 deaths
Textile engineers
People from Nottingham